Hichem Chaabane (born 10 August 1988 in Blida) is an Algerian former professional road cyclist. He represented his nation Algeria at the 2008 Summer Olympics.

Career
Passing through the km mark, Chaabane could not achieve a best possible result with a severe fatigue under Beijing's intense heat and a lapped violation, as he failed to complete a grueling race against a vast field of nearly a hundred cyclists.

Chaabane signed an annual contract with  pro cycling team in 2009. On that same year, he and four other international cyclists were stabbed and injured on a house robbery in Potchefstroom, losing some cash, laptops, and five cellphones from their respective belongings. When  folded after the 2009 season, Chaabane was left with no contract, and ultimately decided to return to Algeria as a freelance agent. In 2010, Chaabane earned his first career title in road cycling for the under-23 division at the African Championships in Tunis, Tunisia.

When he joined with Vélo Club Sovac in 2012 under a bi-annual contract, Chaabane added two more titles for an elite level at the Tour de Blida and at the Algerian Road Championships in Mostaganem.

In April 2015, it was announced that Chaabane had tested positive for two undisclosed prohibited substances and was provisionally suspended from racing.

Major results

2007
 5th Road race, UCI B World Championships
2008
 4th Overall Giro del Capo
 5th Road race, African Road Championships
2010
 1st  Road race, Arab Road Championships
 National Road Championships
2nd Time trial
2nd Road race
2012
 1st  Road race, Arab Road Championships
 1st Stage 4 Tour du Faso
 2nd Time trial, National Road Championships
 African Road Championships
3rd  Team time trial
7th Road race
 4th Overall Kwita Izina Cycling Tour
 5th Overall Tour d'Algérie
 8th Overall Tour of Greece
 9th Challenge Youssoufia, Challenge des phosphates
2013
 National Road Championships
1st  Road race
2nd Time trial
 1st Overall Tour de Blida
1st Stage 3
 2nd  Team time trial, African Road Championships
 5th Overall Tour de Wilaya de Tipaza
 8th Circuit d'Alger
 9th Overall Tour of Eritrea
 10th Overall Tour d'Algérie
 10th Overall Tour of Iran (Azerbaijan)
 10th Trophée de l'Anniversaire, Challenge du Prince
2014
 2nd Grand Prix d'Oran
 6th Overall Tour de Constantine
1st Mountains classification
 7th Critérium International de Sétif
 8th Circuit d'Alger
 9th Overall Tour d'Algérie
1st Stage 5
 9th Overall Tour de Blida
2015
1st Overall Tour d'Annaba
1st Mountains classification
1st Stage 4
 1st Circuit de Constantine
 1st Circuit d'Alger
 Tour Internationale d'Oranie
1st Points classification
1st Stages 1 & 3
 3rd Overall Tour de Blida
1st Stage 3
 5th Team time trial, African Road Championships

References

External links
NBC 2008 Olympics profile

1988 births
Living people
Algerian male cyclists
Cyclists at the 2008 Summer Olympics
Olympic cyclists of Algeria
People from Blida
21st-century Algerian people